Jose Silva is the name of:

 José Asunción Silva (1865–1896), Colombian poet
 José Silva (parapsychologist) (1914–1999), American self-taught parapsychologist and author
 José Silva (baseball) (born 1973), Mexican baseball player
 José Silva (basketball) (born 1989), Portuguese basketball player
 José Silva (canoeist), Venezuelan canoeist
 José Silva (footballer, born 1905), Portuguese footballer in the 1920s and 1930s
 José Silva (sailor) (born 1918), Portuguese Olympic sailor
 José Luis Silva (born 1991), Chilean footballer
 José María Silva (died 1876), Liberal Salvadoran politician
 José Abello Silva, top-ranking member of Colombia's Medellín Cartel
 José Guterres Silva (born 1998), football player who currently plays as for Timor-Leste national football team

See also 
 José da Silva (disambiguation)